I Wear the Face is the 1984 RCA Records debut album from Mr. Mister.  It reached #170 on the Billboard Top 200 chart. It was originally issued with a different cover photograph that was changed after the success of their second RCA album. The lead single from the album, "Hunters of the Night" reached a peak of #57 on the Billboard Hot 100 chart.

In 2016, the album was digitally remastered and released in Japan, using the original artwork.

Track listing
All songs written by Richard Page, Steve George and John Lang except as noted:
"Hunters of the Night" (Page, George, Lang, George Ghiz) – 5:13
"Code of Love" – 4:34
"Partners in Crime" – 4:23
"32" – 4:41
"Runaway" – 4:15
"Talk the Talk" – 4:27
"I'll Let You Drive" – 4:10
"I Get Lost Sometimes" – 3:55
"I Wear the Face" – 4:56
"Life Goes On" (Page, George, Lang, Pat Mastelotto)– 5:15

Personnel 

Mr. Mister
 Richard Page – lead vocals, bass guitar
 Steve George – keyboards, saxophone, backing vocals
 Steve Farris – guitars
 Pat Mastelotto – drums

Production
 Peter McIan – producer, engineer
 Ric Butz – recording
 Paul Ray – assistant engineer
 Stephen Marcussen – remastering
 Joe Stelmach – art direction
 Aaron Rapoport – cover photograph
 Rob Brown – inner sleeve photograph

References

Mr. Mister albums
1984 debut albums
RCA Records albums